The 2011 Norwegian Football Cup was the 106th edition of the Norwegian annual knockout football tournament. It began on 6 April 2011 with the matches of the first qualifying round and ended on 6 November 2011 with the Final. The winners, Aalesund, earned a place in the second qualifying round of the 2012–13 UEFA Europa League.

Calendar 
Below are the dates for  each round as given by the official schedule:

First round
The 49 winners from the Second Qualifying Round joined with 79 clubs from the Premier League, First Division and Second Division in this round of the competition.

|colspan="3" style="background-color:#97DEFF"|30 April 2011

|-
|colspan="3" style="background-color:#97DEFF"|1 May 2011

|-
|colspan="3" style="background-color:#97DEFF"|2 May 2011

|}

Second round
The 64 winners from the First Round took part in this stage of the competition. These matches took place on 11 and 12 May 2011.

|colspan="3" style="background-color:#97DEFF"|11 May 2011

|-
|colspan="3" style="background-color:#97DEFF"|12 May 2011

|}

Third round
The 32 winners from the Second Round took part in this stage of the competition. These matches took place on 25 and 26 May 2011.

|colspan="3" style="background-color:#97DEFF"|25 May 2011

|-
|colspan="3" style="background-color:#97DEFF"|26 May 2011

|}

Fourth round
The 16 winners from the Third Round took part in this stage of the competition.

Quarter-finals 
The 8 winners from the Fourth Round took part in this stage of the competition.

Semi-finals 
The draw for the semi-finals took place on 17 August 2011. The semi-finals took place on 21 and 22 September 2011.

Final 

The 2011 Norwegian Football Cup Final was played on 6 November 2011 at the Ullevaal Stadion in Oslo. The draw for the final was held on 27 September 2011 by the Norwegian Football Association, which decided that Brann was the home team of the final and got to play in their red home kits.

See also 
 2011 Norwegian Premier League

Notes 
All fixtures, results and matchinfo have been retrieved from this page

References

External links 
 

 
Norwegian Football Cup seasons
Cup
Norway